YBS may mean:

 Yale Bright Star catalogue
 Yamanashi Broadcasting System (株式会社山梨放送 Kabushiki-gaisha Yamanashi Hōsō?)
 Yangon Bus Service, Myanmar
 Yorkshire Building Society, UK

See also

 Sinjar Resistance Units (YBŞ)